Oakwood, also known as Trumble Cottage, is a historic plantation house located near Gadsden, Richland County, South Carolina. It was built in 1877, and is a -story, vernacular Victorian frame cottage with Queen Anne style details. The front façade features a one-story porch with scroll-sawn brackets and a highly ornamented gabled dormer.  Also on the property are two slave cabins, a double pen log barn, a corn crib, a frame well house, and another storage building.

It was added to the National Register of Historic Places in 1986.

References

Plantation houses in South Carolina
Houses on the National Register of Historic Places in South Carolina
Victorian architecture in South Carolina
Houses completed in 1877
Houses in Richland County, South Carolina
National Register of Historic Places in Richland County, South Carolina
1877 establishments in South Carolina
Slave cabins and quarters in the United States